The 2017–18 season was Olympiacos's 59th consecutive season in the Super League Greece and their 92nd year in existence. Olympiacos finished 3rd in the league, stopping their 7-year run as champions. They also participated in the Greek Football Cup, where they reached the quarterfinals, and in the UEFA Champions League finishing 4th in the group stage, after managing to qualify during the summer qualification. There was also a record created for season tickets sold (over 21,000). For the first time since the 2009–10 season Olympiacos did not win any competition.

Players

First team

Out on loan

Transfers and loans

Transfers in

Summer 2017 

 (loan return)

 (loan return)
 (loan return)
 (loan return)
 (loan return)
 (loan return)
 (loan return)
 (loan return)
 (loan return)
 (loan return)

 (loan return)
 (loan return)
 (loan return)
 (loan return)
 (loan return)
 (loan return)

 (loan return)
 (loan return)
 (loan return)
 (loan return)
 (loan return)

Transfers out

Summer 2017

Backroom staff

Friendlies

June friendlies

July friendlies

August friendlies

Competitions

Overall

Overview 

{| class="wikitable" style="text-align: center"
|-
!rowspan=2|Competition
!colspan=8|Record
|-
!
!
!
!
!
!
!
!
|-
| Super League Greece

|-
| Greek Cup

|-
| UEFA Champions League

|-
! Total

Super League Greece

League table

Results summary

Results by matchday

Matches 

(change of venue due to unavailability of the Lamia Municipal Stadium)

Greek Football Cup

Group stage 

(change of venue)

Round of 16

Quarter-final

UEFA Champions League

Third qualifying round

Play-off round

Group stage

Squad statistics

Appearances 

Players with no appearances not included in the list.

Goalscorers 
Includes all competitive matches.

Disciplinary record

References

External links 
 Official Website of Olympiacos Piraeus 

Olympiacos F.C. seasons
Olympiacos
Olympiacos F.C.